2011 Abuja bombing may refer to: 

2011 Abuja police headquarters bombing
2011 Abuja United Nations bombing